Picardy is a historical territory of France.

Picardy may also refer to:

Picardy (hymn), a hymn tune
Picardy (wine), an Australian winery
Picardy third, in music, a major key ending to a minor key piece
Picard language, a regional language in northern France and parts of Belgium
Pikkardiyska Tertsia, a Ukrainian music group

See also
Picard (disambiguation)
Picardi, an Italian surname